The 1972 Troy State Red Wave football team represented Troy State University (now known as Troy University) as a member of the Gulf South Conference (GSC) during the 1972 NAIA Division I football season. Led by first-year head coach Tom Jones, the Red Wave compiled an overall record of 4–5–1 with a mark of 2–3–1 in conference play, placing fifth in the GSC.

Schedule

References

Troy State
Troy Trojans football seasons
Troy State Trojans football